USS Maddox (DD-622), a , was the second ship of the United States Navy to be named after United States Marine Corps Captain William A. T. Maddox, who served in the Mexican–American War.

Maddox was laid down on 7 May 1942 by the Federal Shipbuilding & Dry Dock Company, Kearny, New Jersey and launched on 15 September 1942; sponsored by Mrs. Ellen-Venita Browning Wilhoit Gay, great granddaughter of Captain Maddox. The ship was commissioned on 31 October 1942, Lieutenant Commander Eugene S. Sarsfield in command.

Service history
After shakedown, Maddox departed New York on 2 January 1943 for Norfolk, Virginia where she commenced escort duties. Following her first two convoy missions, safeguarding fleet oilers plying between Norfolk and the petroleum centers of Galveston, Texas and Aruba, Maddox began a series of trans-Atlantic voyages escorting convoys from New York and Norfolk to North Africa.

On 8 June 1943, Maddox departed Norfolk for Oran, Algeria, where she became a unit of Task Force 81 (TF 81), the assault force for the Sicilian invasion. As the assault troops opened the amphibious Battle of Gela on 10 July, Maddox was on antisubmarine patrol about 16 miles offshore. Steaming alone, the destroyer was attacked by a German Junkers Ju 88 bomber of KG 54. One of the bombs exploded Maddoxs aft magazine, causing the ship to roll over and sink within two minutes. Lieutenant Commander Sarsfield was posthumously awarded the Navy Cross for heroism displayed in supervising abandon ship. His action was responsible for saving the lives of 74 of the crew of 284.

Maddox was struck from the Navy list 19 August 1943. She received two battle stars for World War II service.

References

External links
 navsource.org: USS Maddox
 hazegray.org: USS Maddox
 Uboat.net: USS Maddox

 

Maddox (DD-622)
Ships built in Kearny, New Jersey
World War II shipwrecks in the Mediterranean Sea
1942 ships
Maddox (DD-622)
Maritime incidents in July 1943
Destroyers sunk by aircraft
Ships sunk by German aircraft
Naval magazine explosions